Wagner Pereira Cardozo, best known as Amaral (born 16 October 1966 in São Paulo, Brazil) is a former Brazilian football striker who currently coaches Japanese international high-school football club in the Gyosei International School, as U-18 team.

Amaral's nickname is "King of Tokyo" and he is considered one of the greatest players in the history of FC Tokyo, which includes its amateur period, called as Tokyo Gas SC. Amaral attended 332 games in FC Tokyo/Tokyo Gas FC. In 2008, the biographical film was made which was "KING OF TOKYO O FILME". Supporters of Tokyo show a big flag of his face on a corner of its home stadium, still now.

Club statistics

References

External links

1966 births
Living people
Brazilian footballers
Brazilian expatriate footballers
Comercial Futebol Clube (Ribeirão Preto) players
Ituano FC players
Sociedade Esportiva Palmeiras players
J1 League players
J2 League players
Japan Football League (1992–1998) players
Japan Football League players
FC Tokyo players
Shonan Bellmare players
Arte Takasaki players
FC Kariya players
Expatriate footballers in Japan
Player-coaches
Brazilian football managers
Expatriate football managers in Japan
Association football forwards
Footballers from São Paulo (state)